Jürgen Rittenauer (born 18 May 1986) is a German former professional footballer who played as a goalkeeper.

Career
Rittenauer joined Hallescher FC in 2009, having played for a number of semi-pro clubs in southern Germany. He served as backup goalkeeper to Darko Horvat. He did not make any appearances as the club won the Regionalliga Nord in the 2011–12 season, but made his 3. Liga debut in a 1–0 defeat to SpVgg Unterhaching in August 2012. He was released by Halle in July 2013 and signed for 1. FC Rielasingen-Arlen.

References

External links

1986 births
Living people
German footballers
Association football goalkeepers
3. Liga players
TSG 1899 Hoffenheim II players
SG Sonnenhof Großaspach players
VfR Aalen players
SC Freiburg II players
Hallescher FC players